The Distaff Side is a 1933 comedy play by the British writer John Van Druten. It premiered at the King's Theatre, Edinburgh before beginning a 102-performance run at the Apollo Theatre in London between 5 September and 2 December 1933. It was produced by Gilbert Miller. The original cast included Sybil Thorndike, Martita Hunt, Clifford Evans, Edgar Norfolk and Viola Keats. Its New York run began in September 1934 and lasted for 177 performances at the Booth Theatre.

References

Bibliography
 Wearing, J.P. The London Stage 1930-1939: A Calendar of Productions, Performers, and Personnel.  Rowman & Littlefield, 2014.

1933 plays
Plays by John Van Druten
Comedy plays
West End plays